Ludovic O'Followell (born 1872 in Portslade -  29 January 1965) was a French doctor and author. He is best known for his work demonstrating the effects of corsets on the shape of the rib cage with X-rays. Following the publication of Le Corset in 1905 and 1908, he encouraged a less severe design of corset and wrote a regular column for the corsetier magazine Les Dessous.

Publications
 Le Corset (1905)
 Le sérum marin (impr. Alcan-Lévy, 1906)
 Le Corset (1908)
 Des Punitions Chez Les Enfants
 Pauvres veuves, pauvres malades, pauvres vieux... (Arrault, 1936)
 Accessible in full text on NordNum.
La Vie manquée de Félix Arvers (Humbert, 1947)
 Déshabillez-vous ... ou soixante ans de la vie d'un médecin, Largentière: Humbert et Fils, 1951.
 En levant les yeux, A. Fauvel, 1955

See also 

 Corset
 X-ray

References

Further reading 

 Le Corset (1908), chapter 2 (in French)

20th-century French physicians

1872 births
1965 deaths